Hou Shuaqiao (1300–1320), also known as Qian Shuaqiao or possibly Qian Shuaxiao, was a Chinese acrobat and actor who played fujing ("secondary jing" or "comic-cum-villain") roles in zaju performances. He was based in Khanbaliq (Dadu), the winter capital of the Yuan dynasty. He was best-known for his somersaults, a required skill for playing martial roles in traditional Chinese operas. His somersaults were the highest of all performers.

Hou Shuaqiao was the husband of two zaju performers, Sailianxiu, and Zhu Jinxiu. Because Sailianxiu was around two decades older than Zhu Jinxiu, Hou Shuaqiao probably married Zhu Jinxiu after Sailianxiu died.

In fiction
Qian Shuaqiao appears (along with Sailianxiu and Zhu Jinxiu) in Tian Han's 1958 play about the playwright Guan Hanqing.

References

14th-century Chinese male actors
Yuan dynasty actors